Donna Vardy is a former English professional squash player.

Donna was born on 16 April 1971 in Mansfield and won the British Under 19 Open title three times from 1987-1989. She represented Nottinghamshire at county level and reached the top ten in the English national rankings and top sixteen in the world rankings. She competed in the British Open Squash Championships throughout the late eighties and early nineties and led England to victory in the 1987 World Junior Championships.

References

1971 births
Living people
English female squash players
Sportspeople from Mansfield